The Dedman College of Hospitality is located in Tallahassee, Florida at Florida State University. The College was founded in 1947 and offers majors in Hospitality Management & Tourism and Global Club Management & Leadership. They previously offered a degree in Professional Golf Management, but the major is no longer offered. The Dedman College was the first hospitality and tourism management program offered in the state of Florida.

The Dedman College of Hospitality is located at University Center B in the south endzone of Doak Campbell Stadium. Based on input from industry representatives, the hospitality management major's business component attracts companies to FSU students and as a result, the college boasts a high job placement record. The Dedman College of Hospitality also offers a major in Global Club Management & Leadership, which is for students interested in the growing industry of international and domestic private clubs and golf resorts. FSU has a long, distinguished history of graduating professional golfers and educating students for business and hospitality operations. As of 2021, the school is now officially a College.

References

External links

 
Hospitality schools in the United States
Educational institutions established in 1947
1947 establishments in Florida